Sneeze Me Away is a 2010 animated short film written and directed by Ryan Grobins.

Premise 
A young boy by the name of Thomas, accidentally enters a fantastic, magical world full of unexpected occurrences and wondrous sights by sneezing with his eyes open, and now must enlist the aid of strange creatures to help him find his way home again.

Crew

Production
Husband and wife team, Ryan and Hyojung spent two years working on the short animated film full-time in South Korea, not including another six months previous to the main production period spent working after hours on the previs in Australia. Hyojung painted the majority of the backgrounds, Stanley Darmawan completed the majority of the character animation, and Ryan did the majority of the other tasks. The backgrounds were all digitally painted in Photoshop, and the characters, while rendered using 3D software, were given a cel-shaded look.

The music was composed and orchestrated by the Australian composer, Nicole Brady. It was performed by The Orchestra of Vienna and Moravian Philharmonic, with solos performed by Martin Penicka (cello) and Nicole Brady (piano).

Accolades
 Hyart Film Festival - Best Animation
 Park City Film Music Festival - Jury Choice Gold Medal for Excellence
 High Desert Shorts International Film Festival - Best Animation
 Canadian International Film Festival - Award of Excellence
 Kids First! Film Festival - Second, Independent Short, Ages 5–8
 Australian Effects & Animation Festival - Finalist
 8th Annual iP Short Film Contest - Finalist
 Rome International Film Festival - Nominated, Best Animation

Festivals 
 Park City Film Music Festival, 2010
 Crystal Palace International Film Festival, 2010
 Animation Block Party, 2010
 Australian Effects and Animation Festival, 2010
 Jiff Theque, Ani Factory, 2010
 Hyart Film Festival, 2010
 Silicon Valley Film Festival, 2010
 Rome International Film Festival, 2010
 Croq’Anime, 2010
 Philly Film and Music Festival, 2010
 Cincinnati Film Festival, 2010
 SoDak Animation Festival, 2010
 Flatland Film Festival, 2010
 Banjaluka, 2010
 Linoleum Animation Festival, 2010
 Radar Hamburg International Independent Film Festival, 2010
 River's Edge International Film Festival, 2010
 African International Film Festival, 2010
 Los Angeles International Children's Film Festival, 2010
 4th Winter International Festival of Arts, 2011
 Athens Animfest, 2011
 Sacramento International Film Festival, 2011
 Downtown Boca Film Festival, 2011
 High Desert Shorts International Film Festival, 2011
 California International Animation Festival, 2011
 Puerto Rico International Film Festival, 2011

References

External links 
 
 
 Nezui

2010 films
2010 animated films
Computer-animated short films
South Korean independent films
South Korean animated short films
2010s English-language films
2010s South Korean films